Fanlore is a wiki created to preserve the history of transformative works, as well as that of fans, and fandoms, with a focus on people and their activities rather than on fandom canon. The beta version of Fanlore launched in September 2008, and the wiki came out of beta in December 2010.  , more than 60,753 pages have been created on Fanlore, with more than 1,212,678 edits made by more than 90,872 registered users. It passed a million edits in January 2021.

Fanlore's focus is for fans to document their understandings of and experiences in fandom, past and present. The intent of its parent group, the non-profit Organization for Transformative Works, is to preserve for future reference fandom occurrences, work done by fans, and their discussions and debates. The site's audiences include fans, journalists, academics, and people new to fandom. Fanlore is run by the Fanlore Committee within the Organization for Transformative Works. Additional volunteers termed Gardeners have extra editing access on the site, and they monitor recent edits to make sure all contributions are properly integrated. These volunteers also answer questions and provide help to fan contributors.

On June 30, 2020, the Fanlore logo was changed, the first logo change in Fanlore's history, after more than 11 years, this change was made to make the logo fit more thematically in line with the rest of the Organization for Transformative Work's logos.

Features and culture
Fanlore's major content categories include Fan Activities, Fan Communities, People, Fandoms, Perspectives on Fans, a Glossary, Tropes & Genres, Fanworks and a Chronology.

Fanlore is guided by the plural point of view (PPOV) policy, which was discussed by one of the Organization for Transformative Works' founders, Francesca Coppa:

Fanlore is much much friendlier and more accepting and less confrontational than most wikis, which can be notoriously hostile places. We have a specific Plural Point of View philosophy and not just accept–but actively seek out–multiple viewpoints in all things.

Many of the people who have been most active on Fanlore are older, more established fans interested in documenting fannish history prior to 2010, leading to a site with a particular focus on zines and fannish activities on LiveJournal. Fanlore continues to solicit contributions from fans with different experiences.

The site hosts regular editing challenges, such as the annual April Showers event and has its own social media outlets. The site's creation and development largely by female fans has also meant a focus on fan history that reflects women's activities in fannish spaces.

Usage
In May 2015, Fanlore announced that the site had been chosen by the American Folklife Center, part of the U.S. Library of Congress, for archiving as part of the Digital Culture Web Archive. The head of the American Folklife Center, Nicole Saylor, explained in 2016 that the site was selected because: "[F]an fiction and other kinds of fan works were identified as significant because fandom enacts so many of the key elements of folklore and vernacular culture. As a result, there are a range of fandom-focused sites that were selected for the collection. We were also interested in harvesting sites where communities had worked to synthesize, organize and collect examples of practice." The site's content was captured from October 7, 2010, to August 5, 2016.

Entries on Fanlore have been used as a resource in a number of media articles and other discussions that feature fan terminology, fan activities, the history of particular genres, fan discussions about their own culture, statements about fanworks by canon creators, documentation about individual fandoms and popular topics, the development of modern fandom, the history of former fan fiction authors, lists of fandom communities, representations of characters, and the topics found in fanworks.

Fanlore's archiving of images has been used in fandom-related media articles. Fanlore also serves as a resource for discussions about the mission of its founding organization, the Organization for Transformative Works.

Aside from the news media, Fanlore has been a resource to academics researching fans and fandom-related topics. As of June 2018, Google Scholar showed 431 citations of the Fanlore wiki.

References

Nerd culture
Fan fiction
Internet properties established in 2008
MediaWiki websites
American online encyclopedias
Fandom